Block Associations and Neighborhood Associations in New York City are non-profit organizations. A block party requires that an applicant must have a block association membership and the supporting signatures of the majority of block residents.

The Bronx 
 Clinton Avenue Block Association

Brooklyn 
 The Park Place – Underhill Avenue Block Association
 CAMBA, Inc. (Church Avenue Merchant Block Association))
 Maple Street Block Association
 Green Avenue Block Association
 100 Jefferson Avenue Block Association
 Norman Street Block Association

Manhattan 
 Gramercy Park Block Association
 Manhattan Community Board 2 Block and Neighborhood Associations
 Manhattan Community Board 3 Block and Neighborhood Associations
 Manhattan Community Board 4 Block and Neighborhood Associations
 10th and Stuyvesant Streets Block Association
 West80s Neighborhood Association
 Avenue A Block Association
 United Block Association
 East Fifth Street Block Association

Queens
 Richmond Hill Block Association
 Woodhaven Residents' Block Association

Staten Island
 Wheeler Avenue Block Association
 Wellbrook Ave. Block Association

See also 
 Business improvement districts in the United States§New York

References 

New York City-related lists